Krasnaya Gora is the name of several inhabited localities in Russia.

Arkhangelsk Oblast
As of 2010, two rural localities in Arkhangelsk Oblast bear this name:
Krasnaya Gora, Kotlassky District, Arkhangelsk Oblast, a village in Zabelinsky Selsoviet of Kotlassky District
Krasnaya Gora, Primorsky District, Arkhangelsk Oblast, a village in Pertominsky Selsoviet of Primorsky District

Bryansk Oblast
As of 2010, two inhabited localities in Bryansk Oblast bear this name:

Urban localities
Krasnaya Gora, Krasnogorsky District, Bryansk Oblast, a work settlement in Krasnogorsky District

Rural localities
Krasnaya Gora, Rognedinsky District, Bryansk Oblast, a settlement in Sharovichsky Selsoviet of Rognedinsky District

Ivanovo Oblast
As of 2010, one rural locality in Ivanovo Oblast bears this name:
Krasnaya Gora, Ivanovo Oblast, a village in Puchezhsky District

Kursk Oblast
As of 2010, one rural locality in Kursk Oblast bears this name:
Krasnaya Gora, Kursk Oblast, a settlement in Berezovsky Selsoviet of Dmitriyevsky District

Moscow Oblast
As of 2010, two rural localities in Moscow Oblast bear this name:

Urban localities
Krasnaya Gora, Shatursky District, Moscow Oblast, a settlement under the administrative jurisdiction of  the work settlement of  Cherusti, Shatursky District

Rural localities
Krasnaya Gora, Volokolamsky District, Moscow Oblast, a village in Spasskoye Rural Settlement of Volokolamsky District

Novgorod Oblast
As of 2010, three rural localities in Novgorod Oblast bear this name:
Krasnaya Gora, Borovichsky District, Novgorod Oblast, a village in Peredskoye Settlement of Borovichsky District
Krasnaya Gora, Lyubytinsky District, Novgorod Oblast, a village under the administrative jurisdiction of  the urban-type settlement of Lyubytino, Lyubytinsky District
Krasnaya Gora, Moshenskoy District, Novgorod Oblast, a village in Dolgovskoye Settlement of Moshenskoy District

Pskov Oblast
As of 2010, one rural locality in Pskov Oblast bears this name:
Krasnaya Gora, Pskov Oblast, a village in Pechorsky District

Tver Oblast
As of 2010, one rural locality in Tver Oblast bears this name:
Krasnaya Gora, Tver Oblast, a selo in Kalininsky District

Tyumen Oblast
As of 2010, one rural locality in Tyumen Oblast bears this name:
Krasnaya Gora, Tyumen Oblast, a village in Dubrovinsky Rural Okrug of Vagaysky District

Vladimir Oblast
As of 2010, one rural locality in Vladimir Oblast bears this name:
Krasnaya Gora, Vladimir Oblast, a village in Kolchuginsky District

Vologda Oblast
As of 2010, three rural localities in Vologda Oblast bear this name:
Krasnaya Gora, Babayevsky District, Vologda Oblast, a village in Pyazhozersky Selsoviet of Babayevsky District
Krasnaya Gora, Kichmengsko-Gorodetsky District, Vologda Oblast, a village in Nizhneyenangsky Selsoviet of Kichmengsko-Gorodetsky District
Krasnaya Gora, Velikoustyugsky District, Vologda Oblast, a village in Opoksky Selsoviet of Velikoustyugsky District

Yaroslavl Oblast
As of 2010, one rural locality in Yaroslavl Oblast bears this name:
Krasnaya Gora, Yaroslavl Oblast, a village in Kladovsky Rural Okrug of Poshekhonsky District

See also
Krasnogorsk (disambiguation)
Krasnogorsky (disambiguation)